Daydreamin' is the only album released by R&B group, Before Dark. It was released on July 11, 2000 through RCA Records, about a year after it was originally set to be released. The group's first two singles, "Come Correct" and "Baby" were released in 1998 and 1999 respectively, but neither was met with much success and RCA decided to delay the album. Early in 2000 the group's third and most successful single "Monica" was released and peaked at 77 on the Billboard 200. Three months after the release of "Monica", Daydreamin' was finally released.

Track listing
"Intro: Going to the Movies" (Gregory Curtis, Michelle LeFleur, Theodore Lefleur, Alvin Lefleur, Simon Lefleur) - 2:06  
"How Could You" (Kevin Briggs, Kandi) - 2:48  
"Monica" (Marc Kinchen, Lil' Mo, Carlos McKinney, Washington) - 4:04  
"As Far as They Know" (Briggs, Kandi) - 3:35  
"Baby" (Kevin Briggs, Chris Stewart, Tab, Turman) - 3:47 (Featuring Solé) 
"Always on My Mind" (Mike Allen, Alvaughn Jackson, Darryl McClary) - 4:28  
"It's All About You" (Stewart, Tab, Turman) - 4:25  
"Interlude: In the Bathroom/Given So Much" (Curtis, LeFleur) - 1:39  
"Come Correct" (Johnta Austin, Charles Farrar, Troy Taylor) - 4:17  
"Tough Love" (LeFleur, Curtis, LeFleur, LeFleur) - 3:56  
"Daydream" (Curtis) - 3:58  
"She (Could Never Be Me)" (Derrick Edmondson, Sherree Ford-Payne) - 5:21  
"Push N Shove" (Lyndon Roach, Roderick Wiggins, Wilkins) - 4:36  
"Back Around" (Stewart, Tab) - 3:35  
"Outro: Leaving the Movies" (Curtis, LeFleur, Lefleur, Lefleur, Lefleur) - 1:39

Personnel 

Mike "Suga" Allen – producer
Mike Allen – producer
Before Dark – vocals, backing vocals
Craig Burbidge – engineer
Greg Curtis – arranger, producer, mixing, vocal producer, instrumentation
Kevin "KD" Davis – engineer, mixing
Tony Dawsey – mastering
Derrick Edmondson – keyboards, programming, multi instruments, producer, engineer
Charles Farrar – producer
Flavahood – programming, multi instruments, drum programming, instrumentation
Sherree Ford-Payne – producer, vocal arrangement, vocal producer
John Fry – engineer
Ben Garrison – mixing
Andy Haller – engineer
Alvaughn Jackson – vocal producer
Kandi – vocal producer, instrumentation
Marc Kinchen – producer
Michelle LeFleur – executive producer, management
Steve Macauley – mixing
Majesty – bass, drum programming
Bill Malina – digital editing, editing
Darryl McClary – producer
Carlos McKinney – producer
Pat Miaba – backing vocals
Mr. Roach – vocal producer
Anthony Morgan – executive producer, A&R
Eliud "Lou" Ortiz – mixing
Tamara Spinner – A&R Coordinator
Chris "Tricky" Stewart – keyboards, programming, producer, engineer, sequencing
Troy Taylor – programming, multi instruments, producer, rhythm arrangements, vocal producer, instrumentation
Kevin Thomas – engineer
Josh Turner – engineer
Tye-V – vocal producer
Roderick Wiggins – producer

References

2000 debut albums
Before Dark albums
RCA Records albums